The Peugeot EX3 was a Peugeot race car c. 1912–1914 with a four-cylinder engine. The car driven by Dario Resta won the  1915 Vanderbilt Cup in San Francisco, California and the United States Grand Prix.

External links
 1915 Vanderbilt Cup

References

EX3